The 1987 IIHF Asian Oceanic Junior U18 Championship was the fourth edition of the IIHF Asian Oceanic Junior U18 Championship. It took place between 15 and 22 February 1987 in Jilin, China. The tournament was won by North Korea, who claimed their first title by finishing first in the standings. China and Japan finished second and third respectively.

Standings

Fixtures
Reference

References

External links
International Ice Hockey Federation

IIHF Asian Oceanic U18 Championships
Asian
International ice hockey competitions hosted by China